Charles Alan Nunn (born 1971) is a British banker and former management consultant, and the chief executive (CEO) of Lloyds Banking Group since August 2021.

Early life
Nunn grew up near Southampton, Hampshire. He was educated at Brookfield Comprehensive School and Itchen Sixth Form College. He earned a bachelor's degree in economics from the University of Cambridge, followed by a master's from INSEAD.

Career
Nunn worked for Accenture for 12 years, in the US, France, Switzerland and the UK. Then in 2006, he joined McKinsey & Company as a partner, and worked there for five years.

Nunn joined HSBC in 2011, rising to global head of personal banking and wealth management.

Nunn succeeded António Horta-Osório on 16 August 2021, after a decade as CEO. He will receive a salary of £5.6 million.

Personal life
Nunn is married, with four children.

References

Living people
British bankers
1970s births
Alumni of the University of Cambridge
INSEAD alumni
HSBC people
Lloyds Banking Group people
McKinsey & Company people
Accenture people
British management consultants